Alexander Freeman (1838–1897) was English astronomer and mathematician and a noted correspondent of James Clerk Maxwell and Willard Gibbs.

References

19th-century English mathematicians
1838 births
1897 deaths
19th-century British astronomers
Place of birth missing